Aleksandr Sergeyevich Fyodorov (born 26 January 1981) is a Russian water polo player who played on the bronze medal squad at the 2004 Summer Olympics. In his later career, he has been playing for Kazakhstan.

See also
 Russia men's Olympic water polo team records and statistics
 List of Olympic medalists in water polo (men)
 List of men's Olympic water polo tournament goalkeepers
 List of World Aquatics Championships medalists in water polo

External links
 

1981 births
Sportspeople from Sevastopol
Russian male water polo players
Kazakhstani male water polo players
Water polo goalkeepers
Water polo players at the 2004 Summer Olympics
Olympic water polo players of Russia
Medalists at the 2004 Summer Olympics
Olympic medalists in water polo
Olympic bronze medalists for Russia
Water polo players at the 2014 Asian Games
Asian Games medalists in water polo
Asian Games gold medalists for Kazakhstan
World Aquatics Championships medalists in water polo
Living people
Medalists at the 2014 Asian Games